Satish Sardar or Satish Chandra Sardar (1902 - 19 June 1932) was a Bengali revolutionary and martyr of the civil disobedience movement in Bengal.

Early life
Satish Sardar was born in British India at Chanderghat village presently in Tehatta subdivision, Nadia. His father was Brajaraj Sardar. The No-Tax movement was started as part of the Civil Disobedience Movement in 1932 and was first initiated in Chanderghat village on 13 April 1932. Sardar joined the movement.

Death
On 19 June 1932, the District committee conference of the Indian National Congress was called in Tehatta and the police declared a curfew in this area. Sardar was going to raise a tricolour flag at the police station when the police fired on him.  He died that day. At Chanderghat, a primary School was established in 1956 in his memory.

References

1902 births
1932 deaths
Revolutionary movement for Indian independence
Indian revolutionaries
People shot dead by law enforcement officers in India
People from Nadia district
Indian independence activists from West Bengal